Ixion, King of the Lapiths, Deceived by Juno, Who He Wished to Seduce is a painting by Peter Paul Rubens, executed  1615. It was part of the Duke of Westminster's collection in the 19th century before passing to baron Basile de Schlichting, who left it to the Louvre Museum in 1914.

On the left, it shows Ixion and the fake Juno sent by Jupiter to avenge himself on the seducer. On the right the real Juno, with her peacock moves towards Jupiter.

External links
http://cartelfr.louvre.fr/cartelfr/visite?srv=car_not_frame&idNotice=5566&langue=fr

1615 paintings
Mythological paintings by Peter Paul Rubens
Paintings in the Louvre by Dutch, Flemish and German artists